Palaistra (Macedonian Slavic: Борешница, Borešnica) is a village in the Florina regional unit, Greece.

Demographics

References

Populated places in Florina (regional unit)